is a  mountain on the border of Minami-Alps, Yamanashi, and  Ina, Nagano, in Japan. This mountain is one of the major peaks of the Akaishi Mountains, and is one of the most popular peaks in the range. This mountain is also one of the 100 Famous Japanese Mountains.

Outline 
Mount Senjō is one of the destinations in Akaishi Mountains for tourists. This mountain has three major peaks, which are Senjō-ga-take, Dai-Senjō-ga-take, and Ko-Senjō-ga-take. 
This mountain can be accessed easily over Minami Alps Gravel Road. This mountain is called 'the queen of Minami-Alps' because of its elegant looks. This area is in Minami Alps National Park that was established on June 1, 1964.

Mountaineering 
British Walter Weston visited Japan several times and wrote in 1896 the book Mountaineering and Exploring in the Japanese Alps. He climbed Mount Senjō in 1904.

Route 
The most popular route to the top of this mountain is from Kitazawa Pass. To the Kitazawa Pass, climbers use buses from Todai-guchi Bus Stop or Hirogawara Bus Stop. It takes about four hours from the pass to the mountain.

Mountain hut and camp site 
There are some mountain huts in the surrounding, and they are opened during the climbing mountain season. There is a "Mountain hut Senjō" in the Yambusawa Cirque near the top of the mountain. Moreover, there is one camp specification ground. That is the large one around "Kitazawa Pass (北沢峠)" that is used as base camp for Mount Senjō or Mount Kaikoma.

Alpine plants and animals 
This mountain is famous for many Alpine plants on the upper part of the mountains above the tree line. Siberian dwarf pine can be see in the place and rock ptarmigan and spotted nutcracker live here as well. Japanese serow and sika deer live in the forest belt in the hillside in the mountain. Then this mountain is selected to " 100 famous Mountains with flowers" and "New 100 famous Mountains with flowers" by Sumie Tanaka.

Geography

Nearby mountains 
It is on the main ridge line in the northern part of the Akaishi Mountains. There are three cirques: "Yabusawa", "Ko-Senjō" and "Dai-Senjō". The ridge on the north side is called "Horseback" ("Uma-no-Se").

Source of river 
Rivers with their source here flow to the Pacific Ocean. 
 Noro River (tributary of Fuji River)
 Todai River, Mibu River (tributary of Tenryū River)

Gallery

See also 
 List of mountains in Japan
 100 Famous Japanese Mountains
 Three-thousanders (in Japan)
 Akaishi Mountains
 Minami Alps National Park

References

External links 

 Geographical Survey Institute
 ‘Kitadake Kaikomagatake Minami Arupusu 2008’

Akaishi Mountains
Mount Senjō
Mountains of Yamanashi Prefecture
Mountains of Nagano Prefecture
Mount Senjō